Jieh-Haur Chen is a professor. Chen (陳介豪) is a Distinguished Professor of National Central University (NCU), Taiwan, where he teaches and performs research related to construction management, computational intelligence, and engineering finance. He is currently the Chairman of Institute of Construction Engineering and Management and the Director of Center of Alumni Relations in NCU.

Education and career
He received his B.S. degree in Civil Engineering from National Central University. His master's degree is in Project Management from the Northwestern University and Ph.D. degree is in Civil Engineering (construction) from the University of Wisconsin-Madison.

References

External links
 Bibliography

Year of birth missing (living people)
Living people
Northwestern University alumni
University of Wisconsin–Madison College of Engineering alumni
Academic staff of the National Central University